Jishou University (sometimes abbreviated as JSU) is a university located in Jishou, Hunan, China.

The university consists of 23 colleges, with 71 specialties for undergraduates, 2 specialties for the second bachelor's degree. At present, the university has 15 provincial engineering research centres and 4 provincial key laboratories.

As of 2022, Jishou University was ranked 690th in the world by SCImago Institutions Rankings. The Best Chinese Universities Ranking, also known as the "Shanghai Ranking", placed the university 299th in China.

History
Jishou University was formed in April 1958 by the CPC Government of the Xiangxi Tujia and Miao Autonomous Prefecture and was initially called "Jishou College".

In August 1978, Hunan Medical University and Xiangtan University, Xiangxi merged into the university.

In August 2000, Jishou Health College merged into the university.

In October 2002, Wuling College merged into the university.

Academics
 School of Chemistry and Chemical Engineering  
 School of Tourism   
 School of Biological Resources and Environmental Science  
 School of Business  
 School of Mathematics and Computer Science  
 School of Physical Education 
 School of Foreign Languages 
 School of Physical Science and Information Engineering 
 School of Literature and Journalism  
 School of Medical 
 School of Music and Dance
 School of Law 
 School of Political Science and Public Administration 
 School of History and Culture
 School of Art
 School of Information Management and Engineering 
 School of Town Planning and Urban Planning 
 School of International Exchange 
 School of Continuing Education 
 School of Marxism
 School of Public Languages  
 School of Preceptors 
 School of Computer General Course
 School of Modern Educational Technology
 Zhangjiajie College

Library collections
Jishou University Library's total collection amounts to more than 2.3 million items.

Culture
 Motto: 
 College newspaper: Journal of Jishou University

People

Notable alumni
 Yang Zhengwu, Hunan Provincial Party Committee Secretary.
 Wu Yunchang, Governor of Xiangxi Tujia and Miao Autonomous Prefecture.
 Peng Xueming, writer, scholar, commentator.
 He Xu, chief editor of Xingchen Online, editor of Changsha Evening News.
 Yao Ziheng, editor and writer.
He Tu, musician producer and singer.

References

External links
 

Universities and colleges in Hunan
Educational institutions established in 1958
1958 establishments in China